RPLS may refer to:

 Registered Professional Land Surveyor, a licensed surveyor in the United States
 Reversible posterior leukoencephalopathy syndrome, a syndrome characterized by headache, confusion, seizures and visual loss
 The ICAO code for Danilo Atienza Air Base